Mataco may refer to:
 Mataco people, or Wichí, an ethnic group of South America
 Mataco language, or Wichí, a language, or a language group, of South America
 USS Mataco (AT-86), an American ship
 Tolypeutes matacus, known in Portuguese as mataco, a species of armadillo

See also 
 Matacoan languages, a language family of South America
 Matacos Department, in Argentina

Language and nationality disambiguation pages